Mariloup Wolfe (born 3 January 1978) is a Canadian actress and film director. She went to F.A.C.E. School, an art school in Montreal. She holds a major in Film Production from Concordia University (2001) and a minor in Cultural Studies from McGill University (1999). Mariloup Wolfe became famous through her role as Marianne in the popular TV series Ramdam broadcast since 2001 on Télé-Québec.

Personal life 
She was married to actor Guillaume Lemay-Thivierge. They have two sons Manoé and Miro Lemay-Thivierge. They announced their separation on 13 November 2015.

Filmography

Film roles
 2001 : The favorite game, Shell look-alike
 2002 : Cul-de-sac, Victoire
 2004 : C.R.A.Z.Y., Brigitte
 2004 : À part des autres, Nellie
 2005 : De ma fenêtre, sans maison, Sylvie
 2007 : Taking the Plunge (À vos marques... party!), Sandrine Meilleur
 2007 : Les rois du surf (animation), voice (lead)
 2009 : Taking the Plunge 2 (À vos marques... party! 2), Sandrine Meilleur
 2010 : Toy Story 3 (animation), voice of Barbie in Quebec version (Histoire de jouet 3)
 2015: Snowtime! (La Guerre des tuques 3D) – Sophie

TV series roles
 1999 : Tag, Camilla
 1999-00 : 2 frères, Ariane Aubry
 2000 : Caserne 24, Marie-Ève
 2000 : Km/h (III), Julie
 2001–08 : Ramdam, Marianne
 2002 : Fred-DY (II), Élise Désy
 2002 : Le plateau, Patineuse artistique
 2002 : Jean Duceppe, Denise Pelletier
 2003 : 3X Rien, Sonia
 2006 : Il était une fois dans le trouble, Sabrina
 2007 : C.A., Marie-Pierre
 2007–08 : Fais ça court!, host (autumn 2007 – winter 2008)
 2010 : Musée Éden, Camille Courval

Director
 2001: Fly fly (short film)
 2004: Trois petits coups (short film)
 2008: Free Fall (Les Pieds dans le vide) (full-length film)
 2019: Jouliks
 2022: Arlette

Awards and nominations

Prizes
 2005 : Prix MetroStar : Youth artiste for Ramdam
 2007 : Prix Artis : Youth artiste
 2007 : Prix KARV : Best mother
 2007 : Prix KARV : Coolest Québécois personality
 2007 : Prix Gémeaux : Best leading youth role for Ramdam
 2008 : Prix Artis : Youth artiste

Nominations
 2004 : Nomination Prix MetroStar : Youth artiste for Ramdam
 2006 : Nomination Prix Artis : Youth artiste for Ramdam
 2004 : Nomination Prix Gémeaux : Best leading youth role for Ramdam

References

External links
 Official Website (in French only)
 Blog about Mariloup Wolfe

1978 births
Living people
Actresses from Montreal
Canadian film actresses
Canadian television actresses
Canadian voice actresses
Canadian women film directors
Concordia University alumni
Film directors from Montreal
French Quebecers
McGill University alumni
21st-century Canadian actresses